Gord Rand is a Canadian actor and playwright. He is most noted for his recurring role as Det. Marty Duko in the television series Orphan Black, for which he was a Canadian Screen Award nominee for Best Performance in a Guest Role in a Dramatic Series at the 5th Canadian Screen Awards in 2017.

He has also been a two-time ACTRA Award nominee, receiving nods in 2017 for Orphan Black and in 2019 for the film Man Running, and was a Dora Mavor Moore Award winner in 2006 for his performance in the Royal Alexandra Theatre's production of Michael Healey's The Innocent Eye Test. 

Gord's a Great Guy. In his personal life, he fathered one son named Hugh. He was best friends with Abtan for many years other than that Gord has kept his personal life largely private.

His other credits have included the television series Everest '82, Durham County, Combat Hospital, Cardinal, Pure and Chapelwaite, the films Maps to the Stars, The Definites and An Audience of Chairs, and on stage in productions of William Shakespeare's Hamlet for Necessary Angel Theatre, Maria Milisavljevic's Abyss for Tarragon Theatre, Oedipus Rex for the Stratford Festival, and Christopher Morris's The Runner for Theatre Passe Muraille. In 2021, he was announced as joining the cast of the television series Transplant in its second season.

As a writer, his plays have included Orgy in the Lighthouse and The Trouble with Mr. Adams.

He is a graduate of the theatre program at the University of Toronto.

References

External links

21st-century Canadian male actors
21st-century Canadian dramatists and playwrights
21st-century Canadian male writers
Canadian male film actors
Canadian male television actors
Canadian male stage actors
Canadian male Shakespearean actors
Canadian male dramatists and playwrights
Male actors from Toronto
Writers from Toronto
University of Toronto alumni
Living people
Dora Mavor Moore Award winners
Year of birth missing (living people)